Puncturella is a genus of minute deepwater keyhole limpets, marine gastropod mollusks or micromollusks in the family Fissurellidae, the keyhole limpets and slit limpets.

Species
Species in this genus include:

 Puncturella abyssicola Verrill, 1885
 Puncturella agger R. B. Watson, 1883
 Puncturella alaris (Simone & C. Cunha, 2014)
 Puncturella altaparva Poppe & Tagaro, 2020
 Puncturella analoga E. von Martens, 1902
 Puncturella antillana Pérez Farfante, 1947
 Puncturella apostrema (Simone & C. Cunha, 2014)
 Puncturella asturiana (P. Fischer, 1882)
 Puncturella billsae Pérez Farfante, 1947
 Puncturella brychia Watson, 1883
 Puncturella canopa (Simone & C. Cunha, 2014)
 Puncturella capensis Thiele, 1919
 † Puncturella capuliformis (Pecchioli, 1864) 
 Puncturella carinifera (Schepman, 1908)
 Puncturella caryophylla Dall, 1914
 Puncturella cearensis (Simone & C. Cunha, 2014)
 Puncturella columbaris (Simone & C. Cunha, 2014)
 Puncturella conica (d'Orbigny, 1841)
 Puncturella cooperi Carpenter, 1864
 Puncturella cucullata (Gould, 1846)
 Puncturella cumingii (A. Adams, 1853)
 Puncturella curva Golikov & Gulbin, 1978
 Puncturella decorata Cowan & McLean, 1968
 Puncturella dorcas Kira & Habe, 1951
 Puncturella enigmatica (Simone & C. Cunha, 2014)
 Puncturella erecta Dall, 1889
 Puncturella expansa (Dall, 1896)
 Puncturella exquisita (A. Adams, 1853)
 Puncturella falklandica (A. Adams, 1863)
 Puncturella fastigiata Adams, 1853
 Puncturella floris (Poppe, Tagaro & Stahlschmidt, 2015)
 Puncturella galeata (Gould, 1846)
 Puncturella galerita Hedley, 1902
 Puncturella gigantea Schepman, 1908
 Puncturella granitesta (Okutani, 1968)
 Puncturella granulata (Seguenza, 1863)
 Puncturella harrisoni Beddome, 1883
 Puncturella hirasei Otuka, 1935
 Puncturella hycavis (Simone & C. Cunha, 2014)
 Puncturella indica E. A. Smith, 1899
 Puncturella kawamurai Habe, 1961
 Puncturella larva (Dall, 1927)
 Puncturella longifissa Dall, 1914
 Puncturella major Dall, 1891
 Puncturella multistriata Dall, 1914
 Puncturella noachina (Linnaeus, 1771) - type species
 Puncturella nobilis (A. Adams, 1860)
 Puncturella nymphalis (Simone & C. Cunha, 2014)
 Puncturella parvinobilis Okutani, Fujikura & Sasaki, 1993
 Puncturella pauper Dall, 1927
 Puncturella pelex (A. Adams, 1860)
 Puncturella piccirida Palazzi & Villari, 2001
 Puncturella pileolus (A. Adams, 1860)
 Puncturella plecta Watson, 1883
 Puncturella pseudanaloga Powell, 1957 
 Puncturella punctocostata Berry, 1947
 Puncturella raricostata Golikov & Sirenko, 1980
 Puncturella regia (Shikama & Habe, 1961)
 Puncturella rimaizenaensis Okutani, Fujikura & Sasaki, 1993
 Puncturella rothi McLean, 1984
 Puncturella serraticosta Herbert & Kilburn, 1986
 Puncturella similis Warén & Bouchet, 2009
 Puncturella sinensis Sowerby, 1894
 Puncturella solis Beck, 1996
 Puncturella spirigera Thiele, 1912
 Puncturella stellasplendida Poppe & Tagaro, 2020
 Puncturella teramachii Kira & Habe, 1949
 Puncturella tosaensis Habe, 1951
 Puncturella verrieri (Crosse, 1871)
 Puncturella volcano Simone & Cunha, 2014 

Species brought into synonymy
 Puncturella aethiopica Martens, 1902: synonym of Rimulanax aethiopica (E. von Martens, 1902) (original combination)
 Puncturella alicei (Dautzenberg & Fischer H., 1897): synonym of Profundisepta alicei (Dautzenberg & Fischer, 1897)
 Puncturella analoga Martens, 1903: synonym of  Puncturella conica (d'Orbigny, 1841)
 Puncturella asturiana (Fischer, 1882): synonym of Cranopsis asturiana (Fischer, 1882)
 Puncturella asturiana var. alta Locard, 1898: synonym of Cranopsis asturiana (Fischer 1882)
 Puncturella christiaensi Kilburn, 1978: synonym of Puncturella nana (Adams, 1872)
 Puncturella corolla Verco, 1908: synonym of Rimulanax corolla (Verco, 1908) (original combination)
 Puncturella craticia Watson, 1883: synonym of Cranopsis asturiana (Fischer, 1882)
  Puncturella decorata Cowan & McLean, 1968: synonym of  Cranopsis decorata (Cowan & McLean, 1968)
 Puncturella demissa Hedley, 1904: synonym of Puncturella kesteveni Hedley, 1900
 Puncturella enderbyensis Powell, 1958: synonym of Fissurisepta enderbyensis (Powell, 1958)
 Puncturella expansa (Dall, 1896): synonym of  Cranopsis expansa (Dall, 1896)
 Puncturella fumarium Hedley, 1911: synonym of  Fissurisepta fumarium (Hedley, 1911)
 Puncturella granulata Seguenza, 1862: synonym of Rimula granulata Seguenza, 1862
 Puncturella henniana Brazier, 1894: synonym of  Puncturella harrisoni Beddome, 1883
 Puncturella kesteveni Hedley, 1900: synonym of Vacerrena kesteveni (Hedley, 1900) (original combination)
 Puncturella microphyma Dautzenberg & Fischer, 1896: synonym of Cornisepta microphyma (Dautzenberg & Fischer, 1896)
 Puncturella nana (Adams, 1872): synonym of Vacerrena nana (H. Adams, 1872)
 Puncturella pacifica Cowan, 1969: synonym of  Fissurisepta pacifica (Cowan, 1969)
 Puncturella profundi (Jeffreys, 1877): synonym of Profundisepta profundi (Jeffreys, 1877)
 Puncturella sportella Watson, 1883 : synonym of  Profundisepta sportella (Watson, 1883)
 Puncturella tuberculata Watson, 1883: synonym of Cranopsis granulata (Seguenza, 1863)
 Puncturella voraginosa Herbert & Kilburn, 1986: synonym of Profundisepta voraginosa (Herbert & Kilburn, 1986) (original combination)
 Puncturella (Cranopsis) antillana Pérez Farfante , 1947: synonym of Cranopsis antillana (Pérez Farfante, 1947)
 Puncturella (Cranopsis) asturiana (Fischer, 1882): synonym of Cranopsis asturiana (Fischer, 1882)
 Puncturella (Cranopsis) billsae Pérez Farfante, 1947: synonym of Cranopsis billsae (Pérez Farfante, 1947)
 Puncturella (Cranopsis) granulata (Seguenza, 1863): synonym of Cranopsis granulata (Seguenza, 1863)
 Puncturella (Cranopsis) serraticostata Herbert & Kilburn, 1986: synonym of Cranopsis serraticostata (Herbert & Kilburn, 1986)
 Puncturella (Cranopsis) tosaensis Habe, 1951: synonym of Cranopsis tosaensis (Habe, 1951)

References

 Vaught, K.C. (1989). A classification of the living Mollusca. American Malacologists: Melbourne, FL (USA). . XII, 195 pp
 Herbert D.G. (1991). Foraminiferivory in a Puncturella (Gastropoda: Fissurellidae). Journal of Molluscan Studies. 57: 127-140.
 McLean J.H. (1996). The Prosobranchia. In: Taxonomic Atlas of the Benthic Fauna of the Santa Maria Basin and Western Santa Barbara Channel. The Mollusca Part 2 – The Gastropoda. Santa Barbara Museum of Natural History. volume 9: 1-160
 Gofas, S.; Le Renard, J.; Bouchet, P. (2001). Mollusca, in: Costello, M.J. et al. (Ed.) (2001). European register of marine species: a check-list of the marine species in Europe and a bibliography of guides to their identification. Collection Patrimoines Naturels, 50: pp. 180–213

External links
 Lowe R. T. (1827). On Balanus punctatus, Puncturella flemingii, together with some corrections relative to Turbo carenus, and some of the Chiton before described. Zoological Journal 3: 76-80
 Risso A. (1826). Histoire naturelle des principales productions de l'Europe méridionale et particulièrement de celles des environs de Nice et des Alpes Maritimes, vol. 4. Paris: Levrault. vii + 439 pp., pls 1-12
 Brown, T. (1827). Illustrations of the conchology of Great Britain and Ireland. Drawn from nature. W.H. Lizars and D. Lizars, Edinburgh and S. Highley, London. 144 pp., 52 pls.
 Adams, A. (1860). On some new genera and species of Mollusca from Japan. Annals and Magazine of Natural History. (3) 5: 299-303 [1 April 1860; 405-413]

 
Fissurellidae